Upham Hall is an academic building on the Miami University campus in Oxford, Ohio, United States. It is located in the center of campus in the academic quad near the university’s seal.
Miami University was founded in 1809 and the first class graduated in 1824.

History

Construction
Construction on Upham Hall began on February 16, 1946, with the laying of the cornerstone in honor of Dr. Alfred H. Upham. At the time, Upham Hall was to be the biggest building on campus. The first part constructed consisted of eighteen classrooms, two seminar rooms, 29 faculty offices, and other service rooms. In the cornerstone on this building was placed a box which contained information about Dr. Upham’s life and death. Some of the materials included in this box were a student directory, newspapers, a 1946 campus yearbook which was dedicated to Dr. Upham, and a photograph of the current president of Miami.

Alfred H. Upham
Dr. Upham was born March 2, 1877, and is from Eaton, Ohio. He first came to Miami University as a freshman undergraduate in 1896. He received his Master's Degree from Harvard University in 1901 and his Ph.D from Columbia University in 1908. He married Mary Collins McClintock on June 28, 1905. With her he had one daughter, Margaret Louise. 
He was president of the University of Idaho from 1920 to 1928, when he then became the president of Miami University until his death on February 17, 1945.  He led Miami during the difficult times of the Great Depression and World War II. 
Dr. Upham was known for many of his writings, including the “Old Miami” anthem, penned in 1909 for the Miami University Centennial . 
Upham also wrote  Old Miami, the Yale of the Early West.

Uses
Upham Hall is the home to many different departments at Miami University. They include anthropology, the Center for Environmental Education, the Scripps Gerontology Center, history, humanities center, Jewish studies, pre-law programs, sociology and gerontology, and statistics. In addition to being the home of these departments, this academic hall is the home to many professors offices and classrooms.

Upham Arch

Perhaps the most famous part of Upham Hall is the Upham Hall Arch, located in the center of the building. Engraved over the arch,  which was added to the building in 1948, are the words of John 8:32: “Ye shall know the truth and the truth shall make you free." The arch was a midpoint between the two parts of campus. To the west of the arch was the campus that already existed, and to the east was the part of Miami’s campus not yet built.

According to the Miami legend, “if you kiss your true love under the Upham Hall Arch, you will marry and the bond will never be broken.” This may be the most famous of the Miami University legends. Related to the Upham Arch superstition is the term “Miami Mergers.” This term is used to describe a marriage between two Miami graduates. As a way to recognize these mergers, Miami sends them a Valentine’s Day card every year they are married, a tradition that started in 1973. Miami has an unusually large number of students who marry each other, approximately 14%, compared to 3–4% for other colleges and universities.

On June 20, 2009, Miami broke a world record due to their long legend of Miami Mergers. 1,087 couples renewed their wedding vows under the Upham Hall Arch. This constituted a Guinness World Record for the most people renewing their wedding vows at once. This number almost doubled the previous record. All 26,472 mergers were invited to the event.

References 

Buildings and structures of Miami University